National Tertiary Route 707, or just Route 707 (or ) is a National Road Route of Costa Rica, located in the San José, Alajuela provinces.

Description
In San José province the route covers Turrubares canton (San Pablo district).

In Alajuela province the route covers Atenas canton (Atenas, Jesús, Escobal districts).

References

Highways in Costa Rica